A lady's navel (hanım göbeği) or woman's navel (kadın göbeği) is a type of sweet pastry from Turkey.  They are made from balls of choux pastry which are given a dimple, deep-fried and then soaked in syrup. Although the original form of the pastry apparently bore little resemblance to a woman's navel (belly button) other than the depressed point or dimple in the center, many modern versions, especially ones created in the United States and United Kingdom since the 1990s, have been intentionally designed to resemble a woman's belly button. Features included for this visual and sensory effect include placing dark-colored powder, often cocoa powder, inside the dimple to resemble dirt or gunk inside the belly button, moulding the interior of the dimple itself to somewhat resemble lumps of umbilical cord tissue, and even inserting either edible or inedible decorations around the dimple to represent navel piercing jewelry.

The dessert reveals sexual imaginations just like other Turkish desserts such as Vezir Parmağı (visier's fingers), Dilber Dudağı (lady lips), Kerhane Tatlısı (brothel dessert), Sütlü Nuriye (Milky Nuriye) etc.

See also
 List of choux pastry dishes
 List of pastries
 Navel orange

References

Turkish pastries
Choux pastry